James "Jim" Quar McPherson, (13 April 1891 in Kilmarnock, Scotland – 12 August 1960 in Newcastle upon Tyne, England) was a Scottish football trainer and manager.

Career

1919–1920: Start in the Netherlands - Olympics with Norway - Wales 
McPherson took up his first position as chief coach in December 1919 at the Dutch club Vitesse in Arnhem, where the former player and president of FC Bayern Munich Willem Hesselink was then president. The club played in the eastern group of the first division. In March 1922, when relegation was avoided thanks to a 4–1 victory over PW from Enschede, a club named after the extraordinarily graceful Princess Wilhelmina, he was honored with a wreath. He then left the club. His successor was the former coach of Bayern, Charles Griffiths, under whom the club was relegated in 1922.

1924–1929: FC Bayern - VfB Leipzig and HRC in Holland 
In April of 1928 he was again in the Netherlands, this time as the successor of the Englishman Herbert "John" Leavey as coach of second division Heldersche Racing Club, usually abbreviated to "HRC", in Den Helder. In the 1928–29 season he finished second behind AVV Zeeburgia. He was succeeded in 1929 by another former English professional James Moore, who opted to become a greengrocer after only one year.

References

Further reading 
 Paul Joannou: Newcastle United: The Ultimate Who's Who 1881 - 2014. N Publishing, Newcastle upon Tyne 2014, p. 372. 
 Dietrich Schulze-Marmeling: Der FC Bayern und seine Juden, Verlag Die Werkstatt, Göttingen, 2011. 
 Uli Hesse: Bayern: Creating a Global Superclub, Yellow Jersey Press, London, 2016.

External links 
 Iain Campbell Whittle: The "Killy" McPhersons & Watt, Scots Football Worldwide
 Alex Jackson: ‘That Prince of Speed Raisers’: James Q. McPherson And Former Pedestrians as Association Football Trainers in the 1900s, Playing Pasts, 21 May 2020
 James McPherson, biographical information on Olympedia

Newcastle United F.C. non-playing staff
Sportspeople from Kilmarnock
Sportspeople from Newcastle upon Tyne
Scottish expatriate football managers
Norway national football team managers
English Football League managers
Norwegian Olympic coaches 
SBV Vitesse managers
FC Bayern Munich managers
Merthyr Town F.C. managers
1891 births
1960 deaths
Anglo-Scots
Scottish expatriate sportspeople in Norway
Scottish expatriate sportspeople in the Netherlands
Scottish expatriate sportspeople in Germany
Association football coaches
Scottish football managers
Expatriate football managers in the Netherlands
Expatriate football managers in Germany
Expatriate football managers in Norway